Cankurtaran can refer to:

 Cankurtaran, İspir
 Cankurtaran Tunnel
 Cankurtaran railway station